Harvel is a village in Christian and Montgomery counties in the U.S. state of Illinois. The population was 178 at the 2020 census.

Geography

Demographics

As of the 2020 census there were 178 people, 92 households, and 61 families residing in the village. The racial makeup of the village was 96.07% White, 0.56% Native American, and 3.37% from two or more races. Hispanic or Latino of any race were 2.25% of the population.

There were 92 households, out of which 65.22% had children under the age of 18 living with them, 54.35% were married couples living together, 6.52% had a female householder with no husband present, and 33.70% were non-families. 27.17% of all households were made up of individuals, and 8.70% had someone living alone who was 65 years of age or older. The average household size was 3.21 and the average family size was 2.67.

The village's age distribution consisted of 28.0% under the age of 18, 7.3% from 18 to 24, 29.7% from 25 to 44, 21.6% from 45 to 64, and 13.4% who were 65 years of age or older. The median age was 36.0 years. For every 100 females, there were 83.6 males. For every 100 females age 18 and over, there were 88.3 males.

The median income for a household in the village was $37,500, and the median income for a family was $56,875. Males had a median income of $48,125 versus $19,750 for females. The per capita income for the village was $18,360. About 8.2% of families and 14.8% of the population were below the poverty line, including 5.0% of those under age 18 and 3.0% of those age 65 or over.

Harvel history

The village of Harvel was incorporated as a village in 1873, and was named for John Harvel, a distinguished Civil War veteran who resided in the area. The first settlers of the area were of German, French, and English extraction, and came to Harvel primarily from the eastern region of the United States.

Notable person

 Ray Schalk, catcher for the Chicago White Sox, inducted into the Baseball Hall of Fame (1955)

References

External links
Harvel Illinois, Historical Society of Montgomery County Illinois

Villages in Christian County, Illinois
Villages in Montgomery County, Illinois
Villages in Illinois
Populated places established in 1873